Kossakówka Manor is the historic home of the Kossak family located at 4 Plac Kossaka in Kraków, Poland. The family moved into the home in 1869.

It is officially classified as a monument since 1960.

Buildings and structures in Kraków
Manor houses in Poland